The Bidi River is a river in Kongo Central, Democratic Republic of the Congo. The river drains into the Inkisi River, the last large tributary of the Congo, which finally drains into the Atlantic Ocean.

References 

Rivers of the Democratic Republic of the Congo